Leslie Smith Dodds (20 September 1912 – 29 November 1967) was an English professional footballer who played as a winger.

References

1912 births
1967 deaths
Footballers from Newcastle upon Tyne
English footballers
Association football wingers
Newcastle Swifts F.C. players
Grimsby Town F.C. players
Hull City A.F.C. players
Torquay United F.C. players
Leyton Orient F.C. players
Hartlepool United F.C. players
Peterborough United F.C. players
English Football League players